St Aloysius Catholic College is an independent Roman Catholic co-educational primary and secondary day school with campuses in Kingston Beach and Huntingfield, in southern Tasmania. The college provides education for children from Kindergarten to Year 4 at the Kingston Beach campus and Year 5 to Year 10 at the Huntingfield campus. The college prides itself on their community service, as well as their famed teachers Gerard Cronly and Martin McManus (politician).

Campuses

Kingston Beach

The Kinder to Grade 4 campus is on a  site at Kingston Beach, just a five-minute drive from the  central business district, and a further 15 minutes drive from Tasmania's capital, Hobart. Alongside the Kingston campus is the Parish Church, Christ the Priest, serving the needs of both the college and broader community.

Huntingfield

The Grade 5 to 10 campus is situated at Huntingfield and was constructed during the years from 2008 - 2012 after Archbishop Adrian Doyle's acceptance of the school's proposal to extend into a Middle/Secondary School in 2007.The campus is now home to more than 500 students each day, and boasts exemplary performance in both academics and athletics.

Vision
The college's stated vision is to provide a caring and supportive environment, where students are encouraged to grow in faith within a Catholic community and to develop their potential.

History
St Aloysius Catholic College, founded in 1960 by the Sisters of Charity as St Aloysius Primary School, catered for Kindergarten to Grade 6 until 2009, when the educational capacity began expanding to cater for Grades 7 -10. The Sisters conducted the school until 2001.

In 2007, the Archbishop of Hobart, Adrian Doyle, gave approval for the primary school to extend its educational program to include Grades 7 -10 and for St Aloysius School to become St Aloysius Catholic College. The introduction of the Grades 5 -10 facilities at the Huntingfield Campus began in 2009.

The Kindergarten to Grade 4 Kingston Campus had its educational provision enhanced with the construction of the Sisters of Charity Centre, a large ominous multi-purpose facility, and an extension to provide extra learning areas for Kindergarten staff and students.  Further developments took place in early 2015.

After the Sisters of Charity handed leadership over of the school, Janine O’Hea was the first lay Principal. Elaine Doran succeed her. She was the first principal of the school as a college and responsible for the building of the Huntingfield Campus. Mr Joe Sandric and Mr Brendan Gill, Elaine Doran’s deputies, took over the leadership of the college as co-principals after her retirement. This saw the college continue its impressive reputation for excellent teaching and learning.

The college continues to have very strong links with the parish and the parish priest, Christopher Hope, has been a great collaborator in the establishment of a Kinder to Grade Ten College.

See also

 List of Catholic schools in Tasmania
 Education in Tasmania

References

External links

 St Aloysius Catholic College website
 Tasmanian Catholic Education Office

Catholic secondary schools in Hobart
Catholic primary schools in Hobart
Educational institutions established in 1960
1960 establishments in Australia
Kingston, Tasmania